Kateřina Smutná (born 13 June 1983) is a Czech national ski team member and a former Austrian cross-country skier.

Personal life 
Smutná grew up in Jablonec and after trying modern gymnastics became a member of ski club in the same town.

Career

For the Czech Republic 
Smutná achieved many success and titles of national champion in younger and junior categories in cross-country skiing as well as rollerski in the summer.

In 2002, Smutná finished 13th at the World Junior Championships. A year later in 2003, she competed in Val di Fiemme as a member of the Czech national cross country team. After an unsatisfying result, she was accused by the head coach of sabotaging the race and was sacked from the national team. This was followed by several incidents and conflicts which she attributed to an inflexible and old-fashioned management system. She last competed for the Czech Republic in 2005.

In March 2016, she won Vasaloppet. and February 2018, she won Tjejvasan.

For Austria 
In 2006, Smutná decided to change her citizenship and continue her sports career in Austria. Her best World Cup finish for Austrian national team was fourth in a sprint event at Whistler Olympic Park, Canada in January 2009. Smutná's best finish at the FIS Nordic World Ski Championships was 11th in the sprint event at Sapporo in 2007.

At the 2010 Winter Olympics in Vancouver, she finished 11th in the individual sprint, 29th in the 7.5 km + 7.5 km double pursuit, and 33rd in the 30 kilometres events.

Cross-country skiing results
All results are sourced from the International Ski Federation (FIS).

Olympic Games

World Championships

World Cup

Season standings

References

External links
 
 Katerina Smutna at Sochi2014.com

1983 births
Austrian female cross-country skiers
Czech emigrants to Austria
Cross-country skiers at the 2010 Winter Olympics
Cross-country skiers at the 2014 Winter Olympics
Czech female cross-country skiers
Living people
Olympic cross-country skiers of Austria
Sportspeople from Jablonec nad Nisou